Douglass Sullivan-Gonzalez (born 1956) is an researcher and writer on Central American history, particularly in the 19th century. He is the author of Piety, Power and Politics: Religion and National Formation in Guatemala, 1821-1871. He also co-edited, with Charles Reagan Wilson, The South and the Caribbean (University Press of Mississippi, 2001).

Career 
Sullivan-Gonzalez is an associate professor of history at the University of Mississippi and serves as dean of the Sally McDonnell Barksdale Honors College.

Books
Piety, Power, and Politics: Religion and Nation Formation in Guatemala, 1821–1871 (University of Pittsburgh Press, 1998)
The Black Christ of Esquipulas: Religion & Identity in Guatemala (University of Nebraska Press, 2016)

References

External links
University of Pittsburgh Press report on Piety, Power and Politics
Online bookstore listing

Living people
20th-century Guatemalan historians
Guatemalan male writers
University of Mississippi faculty
1956 births
21st-century Guatemalan historians